Colla Swart (born 1930) is a South African photographer. She started professional photography in 1982, and has photographed nature and people in and around her birth town of Kamieskroon. Colla and her Canadian photographer friend Freeman Patterson hosted, until recently, annual photographic workshops in Namaqualand, known for its beautiful floral scenery around August to September.

Swart has photographed Namaqualand wild flowers and made multiple exposure photographs.

She currently lives in Piketberg, Western Cape, South Africa, the hometown of her late son, and daughter-in-law.

External links
https://web.archive.org/web/20070607151654/http://www.agape.co.za/colla/

South African photographers
South African women photographers
Living people
1930 births